Shahpur is a town and a nagar parishad in Sagar district in the Indian state of Madhya Pradesh.

Geography
Shahpur is located between the Sagar and Damoh districts. The main industry is agriculture, and several types of grain and vegetables are grown.

Demographics
 Census of India, Shahpur had a population of 12,205. Males constituted 52% of the population and females 48%. Shahpur had an average literacy rate of 59%, close to the national average of 59.5%. Male literacy was 69%, and female literacy was 47%. In Shahpur, 17% of the population was under 6 years of age.

References

Sagar, Madhya Pradesh
Cities and towns in Sagar district